This is a list of notable Azerbaijani Armenians.

Azerbaijani Armenians are people born, raised, or who reside in Azerbaijan, with origins in the area known as Armenian, which ranges from the Caucasian mountain range to the Anatolian plateau.

To be included in this list, the person must have a Wikipedia article showing they are Azerbaijani Armenian or must have references showing they are Azerbaijani Armenian and are notable.

List

Actors
 Hovhannes Abelian - actor
 Anatoliy Eiramdzhan - film director, producer, and writer
 Anna Melikian - film director
 Armen Ohanian - Armenian dancer, actress, writer and translator

Architects
 Boris Babaian - pioneering creator of supercomputers in the Soviet Union
 Karo Halabyan - architect

Art

Business
 Yevgeny Petrosyan - comedian

Military
 Bekor Ashot
 Hovhannes Bagramyan - Army Commander, Marshal of the Soviet Union
 Hamazasp Babadzhanian - Soviet Chief marshal of the armored troops
 Rafael Ivanovich Kapreliants - Hero of the Soviet Union

Music
 Albert Asriyan - composer
 Artemi Ayvazyan - composer
 Alexey Ekimyan - composer and police general
 Andrey Kasparov - pianist, composer and professor
 Alexander Mirzayan - composer
 Avet Terterian - composer

Politicians
 Georgy Shakhnazarov - political scientist

Science
 Hovannes Adamian -  one of the inventors of color television
 Abraham Alikhanov -  physicist and academic

Sports
 Vladimir Akopian - chess player
 Arkady Andreasyan - football player
 Rudolf Atamalyan - football player
 Karina Aznavourian - épée fencer
 Vladimir Bagirov - chess player
 Elina Danielian - chess player
 Garry Kasparov - grandmaster and world champion
 Melikset Khachiyan - chess player
 Eduard Markarov - football player
 Alexander Mirzoyan - football player
 Yura Movsisyan - football player
 Ashot Nadanian - chess player
 Sergey Petrosyan - weightlifter

Writers
 Pertch Proshian - writer
 Alexander Shirvanzade - playwright and novelist, awarded by the "People's Writer of Armenia" and "People's Writer of Azerbaijan" titles

See also
 Armenians in Azerbaijan
 List of Armenians

References
 Census of Armenians in Azerbaijan

Lists of Armenian people
Demographics of Azerbaijan
Armenian